George Ignatius Brizan, CMG, CBE (31 October 1942 – 18 February 2012) was a Grenadian politician who served as Prime Minister of Grenada for four months in 1995. He moved to the top post in February, upon the resignation of Nicholas Brathwaite, and remained in office until Keith Mitchell was inaugurated on 22 June.

Life and career
Following studies in Economics, History and Education, George Brizan began public service as a teacher at the venerable Grenada Boys' Secondary School (GBSS) and later as vice-principal of the Institute for Further Education (IFE), one of the predecessor institutions to the T.A. Marryshow Community College ("TAMCC").  On several occasions, Brizan was called upon by governments to serve in various capacities particularly in the areas of trade and development.  At various times in his long and illustrious career, Brizan served as a Trade Union leader, Economics, History and Education Lecturer and even a Sports Announcer/Commentator in the island's annual inter-collegiate track and field competition, popularly known as "Intercol." Brizan had the distinction of working for or consulting with every Grenada government since the late 1960s.  and when he became a consultant in the Ministry of Finance in the Keith Mitchell administration, he became and remains to this day the only former Prime Minister in the Caribbean to work for or serve in a successor government.  A prolific author, Brizan authored one of the seminal works on Grenada's history, Grenada: Island of Conflict.  Brizan was instrumental in guiding and serving as a role model for hundreds of Grenadian students over the years.  Indeed, it was not uncommon for students to declare a desire to be a "Brizan" (i.e. Economist/Historian) as their career goal.  That to this day Economics remains one of the most popular courses of study for Grenadian students is a testament to Brizan's influence.

Brizan formed and led the National Democratic Party, which later merged with the Grenada National Party (led by Herbert Blaize) and the Grenada Democratic Movement (led by Dr. Francis Alexis) in August 1984 to create The New National Party (NNP). In April 1987, Brizan went into opposition and founded the National Democratic Congress (NDC). He was the Leader of the Opposition in the House of Representatives of Grenada from 1987 to 1990. He was subsequently succeeded as NDC leader by Nicholas Brathwaite. Braithwaite became Prime Minister following the NDC victory in the 1990 election, and Brizan served in Braithwaite's Cabinet as Minister of Finance before being moved to the post of Minister of Agriculture on 27 April 1992. In both of these positions, he additionally held the portfolios of Trade, Industry, Production and Energy.

After Braithwaite resigned from the party leadership in July 1994, Brizan was elected as NDC leader at a party convention on 4 September 1994. He then became Prime Minister upon Brathwaite's resignation from that position on 1 February 1995. In addition to serving as Prime Minister, he took responsibility for the portfolios of External and National Security, Home Affairs, Agriculture, and Personnel and Management.

The NDC was beaten in the June 1995 general election, and Brizan resigned from the party leadership and active, front-line politics after the NDC suffered a more severe defeat in the January 1999 general election, failing to win any seats. Brizan became again the Leader of the Opposition in the House of Representatives of Grenada for the term from 1995 to 1999. He remained a highly sought-after Economic and Politics expert although he considered himself semi-retired due to pressing health issues.

He was appointed Commander of the Order of the British Empire (CBE) in the 2009 New Year Honours.

Brizan died at the General Hospital in St. George's, Grenada, on 18 February 2012, aged 69. He was given a state funeral and today rests in St. George's Centre Cemetery, not far from Presentation Brothers' College, one of his alma maters.

References

1942 births
2012 deaths
University of the West Indies alumni
University of Calgary alumni
Prime Ministers of Grenada
Finance ministers of Grenada
Members of the House of Representatives of Grenada
National Democratic Congress (Grenada) politicians
New National Party (Grenada) politicians
Commanders of the Order of the British Empire
Companions of the Order of St Michael and St George
Deaths from diabetes
People from Saint David Parish, Grenada
20th-century Grenadian politicians